The Bram Stoker Award for Best Alternative Forms is a discontinued award presented by the Horror Writers Association (HWA) for "superior achievement" in horror writing in alternative media.

Winners and nominees
This category was previously titled "other media". Nominees are listed below the winner(s) for each year.

Other Media (1993-2000)

Alternative Forms

References 

Alternative Form
1993 establishments in the United States
Awards established in 1993
Awards disestablished in 2004
2004 disestablishments in the United States
English-language literary awards